|}

The Coral Welsh Grand National is a Premier Handicap National Hunt steeplechase in Great Britain which is open to horses aged four years or older. It is run at Chepstow, Wales, over a distance of about 3 miles and 6½ furlongs (3 miles 6 furlongs and 130 yards, or 6,154 metres), and during its running there are twenty-three fences to be jumped. It is a handicap race, and it is scheduled to take place each year on 27 December.

The race was first run in 1895, and it originally took place at Ely Racecourse in Cardiff. It remained at this venue until the closure of the course in 1939. After World War II it was transferred to Newport Racecourse in 1948, and it was then moved to its present venue in 1949. Dick Francis, the famous jockey turned author, rode the first Chepstow winner of the race, Fighting Line.  David Nicholson, later a successful racehorse trainer, rode three successive Welsh National winners in 1959, 1960 and 1961.

Originally run on Easter Tuesday, it was moved to February in 1969 with the aim of attracting better horses, albeit with the increased risk of bad weather forcing its cancellation.  It has been sponsored by bookmakers Coral from 1973 and is now the longest running sponsorship in jump racing. The race was given Grade 3 status when the National Hunt Pattern was revised in 1989 and was re-classified as a Premier Handicap from the 2022 running when Grade 3 status was renamed by the British Horseracing Authority.

It was moved to late December in 1979, after that year's original fixture was abandoned due to snow. The meeting is now held the day after Boxing Day and since then the class of runners has improved further, making it an informative guide to future races such as the Grand National and the Cheltenham Gold Cup. The race distance was extended from 3 miles 5 furlongs and 110 yards to its present distance in 2019, to allow a longer run to the first bend; this also meant that field now jumps 23 fences rather than the previous 22.

Among the winners were Burrough Hill Lad in 1983, who went on to land the Tote Cheltenham Gold Cup less than three months later.  Trainer Jenny Pitman had the previous season saddled Corbière to win the Welsh and Aintree Nationals.  In the late 80s and early 90s, the race was dominated by Somerset trainer Martin Pipe. Bonanza Boy achieved consecutive successes in 1988 and 1989, and in 1991 the giant Carvill's Hill became one of the easiest winners in the history of the race.

More recent winners of both the Welsh and the Aintree Grand National are Bindaree and Silver Birch.  The 2010 winner, Synchronised, went on to win the 2012 Cheltenham Gold Cup. The 2016 winner Native River, ridden by champion jockey Richard Johnson, went on to win the 2018 Cheltenham Gold Cup.

Winners since 1948
 Weights given in stones and pounds.

See also
 Horseracing in Great Britain
 List of British National Hunt races

References

 Racing Post:
, 

 pedigreequery.com – Welsh National – Chepstow.
 
 Race Recordings 1980–2009 

National Hunt races in Great Britain
Chepstow Racecourse
National Hunt chases
Recurring sporting events established in 1895
Horse racing in Wales
1895 establishments in Wales